Figg is a surname. Notable people with the name include:

 Christopher Figg (born 1957), English film producer
 Eugene Figg (1936–2002), American structural engineer 
 George Figg (1824–1888), English cricketer
 James Figg (before 1700–1734), English bare-knuckle boxer
 William Douglas Figg, Sr. (born 1963) American pharmacologist

Fictional characters
 Pristine Figg, the antagonist of Tom and Jerry: The Movie. Voiced by Charlotte Rae.

See also
 Fig (disambiguation)
 Figgs (disambiguation)